Jacob Neusner (July 28, 1932 – October 8, 2016) was an American academic scholar of Judaism. He was named as one of the most published authors in history, having written or edited more than 900 books.

Life and career
Neusner was born in Hartford, Connecticut, to Reform Jewish parents. He graduated from William H. Hall High School in West Hartford. He then attended Harvard University, where he met Harry Austryn Wolfson and first encountered Jewish religious texts. After graduating from Harvard in 1953, Neusner spent a year at the University of Oxford.

Neusner then attended the Jewish Theological Seminary of America, where he was ordained as a Conservative Jewish rabbi. After spending a year at Hebrew University of Jerusalem, he returned to the Jewish Theological Seminary and studied the Talmud under Saul Lieberman, who would later write a famous, and highly negative, critique of Neusner's translation of the Jerusalem Talmud. He graduated in 1960 with a master's degree. Later that year, he received a doctorate in religion from Columbia University.

Afterward, he briefly taught at Dartmouth College. Neusner also held positions at University of Wisconsin–Milwaukee, Brandeis University, Brown University, and the University of South Florida.

In 1994, Neusner began teaching at Bard College, working there until 2014. After leaving Bard College, he founded the Institute for Advanced Theology with Bruce Chilton.

He was a life member of Clare Hall, Cambridge University. He was the only scholar to have served on both the National Endowment for the Humanities and the National Endowment for the Arts.

Neusner died on October 8, 2016 at the age of 84.

Scholarship

Rabbinic Judaism 
Neusner's research centered on rabbinic Judaism of the Mishnaic and Talmudic eras. His work focused on bringing the study of rabbinical text into nonreligious educational institutions and treating them as non-religious documents.

He was a pioneer in the application of "form criticism" approach to Rabbinic texts.  Much of Neusner's work focused on deconstructing the prevailing approach that viewed Rabbinic Judaism as a single religious movement within which the various Rabbinic texts were produced.  In contrast, Neusner viewed each rabbinic document as an individual piece of evidence that can only shed light on the more local Judaisms of such specific document's place of origin and the specific Judaism of the author. His 1981 book Judaism: The Evidence of the Mishnah is the classic statement of his work and the first of many comparable volumes on the other documents of the rabbinic canon.

Neusner's five-volume History of the Jews in Babylonia, published between 1965-1969, is said to be the first to consider the Babylonian Talmud in its Iranian context. Neusner studied Persian and Middle Persian to do so.

Neusner's method of studying documents individually without contextualizing them with other Rabbinic documents of the same era or genre led to a series of studies on the way Judaism creates categories of understanding, and how those categories relate to one another, even as they emerge diversely in discrete rabbinic documents.

Neusner, with his contemporaries, translated into English nearly the entire Rabbinic canon. This work has opened up many Rabbinic documents to scholars of other fields unfamiliar with Hebrew and Aramaic, within the academic study of religion, as well as in ancient history, culture and Near and Middle Eastern Studies.  His translation technique utilized a "Harvard-outline" format which attempts to make the argument flow of Rabbinic texts easier to understand for those unfamiliar with Talmudic reasoning.

Neusner's enterprise was aimed at a humanistic and academic reading of classics of Judaism.  Neusner was drawn from studying text to context. Treating a religion in its social setting, as something a group of people do together, rather than as a set of beliefs and opinions.

Theological works 
In addition to his historical and textual works, Neusner also contributed to the area of Theology. He was the author of  "Israel:" Judaism and its Social Metaphors and The Incarnation of God: The Character of Divinity in Formative Judaism.

Jewish studies 
In addition to his scholarly activities, Neusner was involved in Jewish Studies and Religious Studies. Neusner saw Judaism as "not particular but exemplary, and Jews not as special but (merely) interesting."

Interfaith work 
Neusner wrote a number of works exploring the relationship of Judaism to other religions. His A Rabbi Talks with Jesus attempts to establish a religiously sound framework for Judaic-Christian interchange. It earned the praise of Pope Benedict XVI and the nickname "The Pope's Favorite Rabbi". In his book Jesus of Nazareth, Benedict referred to it as "by far the most important book for the Jewish-Christian dialogue in the last decade."

Neusner also collaborated with other scholars to produce comparisons of Judaism and Christianity, as in The Bible and Us: A Priest and A Rabbi Read Scripture Together. He collaborated with scholars of Islam, conceiving World Religions in America: An Introduction, which explores how diverse religions have developed in the distinctive American context.

Neusner composed numerous textbooks and general trade books on Judaism. The two best-known examples are The Way of Torah: An Introduction to Judaism (Belmont 2003); and Judaism: An Introduction.

Throughout his career, Neusner established publication programs and series with various academic publishers. Through these series, through reference works that he conceived and edited, and through the conferences he sponsored, Neusner advanced the careers of dozens of younger scholars from across the globe.

Political views 
Neusner called himself a Zionist, but also said "Israel’s flag is not mine. My homeland is America." He was culturally conservative, and opposed feminism and affirmative action.

Neusner was a signer of the conservative Christian Cornwall Declaration on Environmental Stewardship, which expresses concern over what it called "unfounded or undue concerns" of environmentalists such as "fears of destructive manmade global warming, overpopulation, and rampant species loss".

Critical assessment of Neusner's work 
Neusner's original adoption of form criticism to the rabbinic texts proved highly influential both in North American and European studies of early Jewish and Christian texts. His later detailed studies of Mishnaic law lack the densely footnoted historical approach characteristic of his earlier work. As a result, these works, focusing on literary form, tend to ignore contemporary external sources and modern scholarship dealing with these issues. The irony was that his approach  adopted the analytic methodology developed by Christian scholars for the New Testament, while denying there was any relationship between the (Judeo-)Christian corpus and rabbinic works, the latter being treated as isolates detached from their broader historical contexts.

A number of scholars in his field of study were critical of this phase in his work .

Some were critical of his methodology, and asserted that many of his arguments were circular or attempts to prove "negative assumptions" from a lack of evidence, while others concentrated on Neusner's reading and interpretations of Rabbinic texts, finding that his account was forced and inaccurate.

Neusner's view that the Second Commonwealth Pharisees were a sectarian group centered on "table fellowship" and ritual food purity practices, and lacked interest in wider Jewish moral values or social issues, has been criticized by E. P. Sanders,  Solomon Zeitlin and Hyam Maccoby.

Some scholars questioned Neusner's grasp of Rabbinic Hebrew and Aramaic. The most famous and biting criticism came from one of Neusner's former teachers, Saul Lieberman, about Neusner's translation of the Jerusalem Talmud. Lieberman wrote, in an article circulated before his death and then published posthumously: "...one begins to doubt the credibility of the translator [Neusner].  And indeed after a superficial perusal of the translation, the reader is stunned by the translator's ignorance of rabbinic Hebrew, of Aramaic grammar, and above all of the subject matter with which he deals." Ending his review, Lieberman states "I conclude with a clear conscience: The right place for [Neusner's] English translation is the waste basket" while at the same time qualifying that "[i]n fairness to the translator I must add that his various essays on Jewish topics are meritorious. They abound in brilliant insights and intelligent questions." Lieberman highlights his criticism as being of Neusner's "ignorance of the original languages," which Lieberman claims even Neusner was originally "well aware of" inasmuch as he had previously relied on responsible English renderings of rabbinic sources, e.g., Soncino Press, before later choosing to create his own renderings of rabbinic texts. Lieberman's views were seconded by Morton Smith, another teacher who resented Neusner's criticism of his views that Jesus was a homosexual magician.

Neusner  thought Lieberman's approach reflected the closed mentality of a yeshiva-based education that lacked familiarity with modern formal textual-critical techniques, and he eventually got round to replying to Lieberman's charges by writing in turn an equally scathing monograph entitled:Why There Never Was a Talmud of Caesarea: Saul Lieberman’s Mistakes (1994). In it he attributed to Lieberman 'obvious errors of method, blunders in logic'  and argued that Lieberman’s work showed a  systematic inability to accomplish critical research.

Publications

References

Further reading
 Hughes, Aaron W. Jacob Neusner: An American Jewish Iconoclast. New York: NYU Press, 2016.

External links 
"Scholar of Judaism, Professional Provocateur," Dinitia Smith, The New York Times, April 13, 2005
Sh'ma articles by Jacob Neusner
"Jacob Neusner, Judaic Scholar Who Forged Interfaith Bonds, Dies at 84", William Grimes, The New York Times, October 10, 2016

1932 births
2016 deaths
Writers from Hartford, Connecticut
Alumni of Lincoln College, Oxford
Bard College faculty
Jewish biblical scholars
American biblical scholars
Old Testament scholars
American Conservative rabbis
Harvard University alumni
Talmudists
Talmud translators
University of Wisconsin–Milwaukee faculty
20th-century American rabbis
American Jewish theologians
Jewish Theological Seminary of America semikhah recipients
University of South Florida faculty
Presidents of the American Academy of Religion
Jewish translators
Jewish American writers
Historians of Jews and Judaism
American historians of religion
20th-century Jewish biblical scholars
21st-century Jewish biblical scholars
American Zionists
20th-century translators
Brown University faculty
Hall High School (Connecticut) alumni
21st-century American rabbis
Historians from Connecticut
Male critics of feminism